Emamzadeh Shah Gharib (also Romanized as Emāmzādeh Shāh Gharīb; also known as Emāmzādeh Shāh-e Gheyb) is a village in Juyom Rural District, Juyom District, Larestan County, Fars Province, Iran. At the 2006 census, its population was 25, in 5 families.

References 

Populated places in Larestan County